The Lower Erebus Hut (LEH) is a permanent field facility located on Mount Erebus on Ross Island, Antarctica. The hut served as the seasonal base of the Mount Erebus Volcano Observatory (MEVO), run by New Mexico Institute of Mining and Technology (NMT). The installation comprises two huts, one kitchen and recreation building and one working and storage building.

History
The permanent LEH  was built in November 1992 as a replacement for the Upper hut and other semi-permanent Jamesway huts.

Location
LEH is located on the northern side of Mount Erebus within its caldera rim. The location facilitates trips to the crater rim where the volcano's persistent lava lake is visible.

Science

Major support for all operations at LEH are conducted through McMurdo Station run by a division of NSF, the United States Antarctic Program (USAP).

LEH is used as a base of operations for the monitoring of Mt Erebus, other scientific studies, and maintenance of such equipment.  The work force at LEH, which is composed of senior research scientists, professors and graduate students, maintains both scientific and logistical equipment on the mountain.  Past research has included gaseous emission concentration, composition and flux as well as thermal image stills, visible and IR video, seismic, and infrasonic studies of the volcano.

See also
 List of Antarctic research stations
 List of Antarctic field camps

References

External links
NMT New Mexico Institute of Mining and Technology
UNAVCO UNAVCO Polar Services - Antarctic - Geodetic Benchmarks

Ross Island
Outposts of Antarctica
Outposts of the Ross Dependency
Volcano observatories
Buildings and structures completed in 1992
1992 establishments in Antarctica